Hasley is a surname. Notable people with the surname include:

Fred Hasley (1884–1939), American typesetter and politician
Louis Hasley (1906–1986), American professor, writer, poet, essayist, editor, and critic

See also
Halsey (surname)

English-language surnames